International Studies Perspectives is a quarterly peer-reviewed academic journal published by Oxford University Press on behalf of the International Studies Association. The journal was established in 2000. The editor-in-chief is Laura Neack (Miami University). The journal covers international studies. According to the Journal Citation Reports, the journal has a 2015 impact factor of 0.914.

References

External links

Oxford University Press academic journals
English-language journals
Publications established in 2000
Quarterly journals
International relations journals